Parliament Hill is an area of open parkland in the south-east corner of Hampstead Heath in north-west London.

History
A mound on the hill may have been a Bronze Age burial barrow. In 1133, the hill was part of a manor that Henry I gave to a baron called Richard de Balta. During Henry II's reign it was passed to Alexander de Barentyn, the king's butler. The area that was known as Traitors' Hill may have acquired its current name during the English Civil War in the 17th century, when it was occupied by troops loyal to the English Parliament. A legend states that this was the site from where Guy Fawkes and Robert Catesby, of the Gunpowder Plot on November the 5th 1605, planned to watch the destruction of Parliament.

Over time, plots of land in the manor were sold off for building, particularly in the early 19th century, though the hill remained mainly common land. In 1875 Hampstead Heath was acquired for the people by the Metropolitan Board of Works. Thirteen years later Parliament Hill was purchased for the public for £300,000 and added to Hampstead Heath.

 Nevertheless, manorial rights to the land remained in private hands until the mid 20th century when they lapsed under Sir Spencer Pocklington Maryon-Wilson, who died in 1944, when the titular estate was passed on to his grandson Shane Gough, 5th Viscount Gough. Until the 1940s, livestock was still reared on the hill to be sold through Smithfields, the London meat market.

The City of London Corporation has managed Parliament Hill since 1989. Before that it was managed by the GLC and then Camden Council.

Local area
It is administered by the City of London Corporation together with the rest of Hampstead Heath. The Eastern (Highgate) side, including Parliament Hill Lido, is known as Parliament Hill Fields, and a local girls' school, Parliament Hill School, is named after it.

Activities

Cross-country running
Parliament Hill is renowned as a cross-country running venue and hosted the 1957, 1961, 1965, 1969, 1973, 1977, 1981, 1993 and 2003 men's English National Cross Country Championships and the 2006, 2009, 2012, 2015, 2018  and 2022 men's and women's English National Cross Country Championships.

Hampstead Rugby Club
The Hill is also used by Hampstead Rugby Club. The senior men's and women's teams train in the middle of the running track and on parts of the hill.

The men's section is one of the oldest in the World. However it was disbanded for the 2nd WW and did not regroup until the mid 1960s.

Since the formation of the RFU leagues it is the only club to be ever present in London 2 NW. The club's most successful seasons were 2016/17 and 2017/18, when they won 18 games and then 19 games and 1 draw.

In film, literature, art and the media
Scenes in films:
The Wedding Date - 2005
Notes On A Scandal - 2006
Run Fatboy Run - 2007
Before I Go to Sleep - 2014  
Absolutely Anything - 2015
Allied - 2016
Eternals - 2021

Scenes in television:
Turn Up Charlie - 2019

Scenes in literature:
Adamson, E.V. Five Strangers - 2021

See also
Canada
Parliament Hill, Ottawa
Parliament Hill (Quebec City)
China
Government Hill, Hong Kong

References
Notes

References

External links
BBC website
A Map of Hampstead Heath showing the location of Parliament Hill

Parks and open spaces in the London Borough of Camden
Hills of London